Ear Spring is a hot spring in the Upper Geyser Basin of Yellowstone National Park in the United States. This was the largest eruption the pool may have had since 1957. The eruption tossed small rocks out and the heated water killed the surrounding bacterial mats that normally thrive in less heated conditions. Likely related to the eruption of Ear Spring, a new thermal feature opened up under the pedestrian boardwalk near Pump Geyser which resulted in the National Park Service temporarily closing off the boardwalk. This new thermal feature was spouting water the night of September 18-19, 2018. Additionally, Doublet Pool and North Goggles Geyser have both been more active in the period immediately after the rare eruption of Ear Spring.

References 

Geothermal features of Yellowstone National Park
Geothermal features of Teton County, Wyoming
Hot springs of Wyoming